The 2006–07 season was Port Vale's 95th season of football in the English Football League, and third successive season in League One. Martin Foyle's side again finished in mid-table, whilst exiting the FA Cup and the League Trophy at the Second Round. Vale, notoriously poor performers in the League Cup, managed to reach the Fourth Round for the first time, at which point they were beaten by top-flight Tottenham Hotspur. Strike partners Leon Constantine and Akpo Sodje put in a 42-goal partnership, with Sodje picking up the club's Player of the Year award. At the end of the season top-scorer Constantine left the club, as did senior midfielder Danny Sonner, scuppering Foyle's long-term plans.

Overview

League One
The pre-season saw Martin Foyle make a number of signings, including: Danny Sonner (Peterborough United); Jason Talbot (Mansfield Town); Paul Harsley (Macclesfield Town); Richard Walker (Crewe Alexandra); Danny Whitaker (Macclesfield Town); Colin Miles (Yeovil Town); and Akpo Sodje (Darlington). He also took Stefan Moore on loan from Queens Park Rangers, and utility player Ritchie Humphreys from Hartlepool United. Youth team player Danny Glover, son of assistant manager Dean Glover, was also given a squad number.

The season started with Vale in fine form, winning their first four games. His four goals meant Constantine was named the division's Player of the Month for August. This run came to a halt with four defeats in the next five games, Vale scoring just three goals. In November, Ross Gardner was signed on loan from Nottingham Forest, and would join permanently in the January transfer window. Foyle also signed defender Clayton Fortune on a season long loan for a second time, this time from Leyton Orient. Heading into December with just three wins in fifteen league games, they won their first four games, with Constantine hitting five of Vale's nine goals. In January, Foyle splashed out £30,000 on Crewe Alexandra striker Luke Rodgers. He also signed former teammate Paul Musselwhite as an emergency back-up goalkeeper following an injury to Mark Goodlad, as well as Cardiff City midfielder Malvin Kamara. He also turned down an offer from Barnsley of £200,000 (plus Marc Richards) for Constantine, who claimed to be happy at Vale Park. However he did sell skilful winger Jeff Smith to Carlisle United for £60,000. Also leaving Burslem was Louis Briscoe, who was allowed to join Leek Town. Vale's form had left them once again, as they failed to pick up a win in a sequence of seven games. In February, defender Rhys Weston joined on a short-term contract, having left Norwegian club Viking FK. On 10 March, Vale travelled to the Don Valley Stadium, and Sodje managed to hit four goals past the Rotherham United defence to give Vale a 5–1 win. This gave Vale fans a sliver of hope of reaching the play-offs, but Vale failed to string two wins together in their final nine games, despite a 3–0 win over nearby Crewe Alexandra.

They finished in twelfth place with sixty points, a clear distance from both the play-off and the relegation zones. They again had the lowest numbers of draws in the division, recording just six stalemates. Constantine was the second-highest scorer in the division after Billy Sharp of Scunthorpe United. Player of the Year Sodje also hit sixteen goals. Captain George Pilkington and midfielder Danny Whitaker missed just two games between them all season.

At the end of the season a number of players were released: Nathan Lowndes (Chester City); George Abbey (Crewe Alexandra); Rhys Weston (Walsall); Michael Husbands (Macclesfield Town); Christian Smith (Clyde); Ross Gardner (Ilkeston Town); Malvin Kamara (Huddersfield Town); Michael Walsh and Mark Soboljew. Leon Constantine also decided against signing a new contract at Vale, and instead joined Leeds United. Danny Sonner also rejected his contract offer, and moved on to Walsall, but not before making a parting shot at the club's leadership.

Finances
The club had to make monthly repayments of around £19,000 for a £2.25 million loan taken out from the local council in 2005. The club's shirt sponsorship came from local company BGC Gas.

Cup competitions
In the FA Cup, Vale advanced past League Two side Lincoln City with a 2–1 victory at Sincil Bank. However they then were on the end of a 4–0 hiding from Hereford United at Edgar Street in the Second Round.

In the League Cup, Vale faced Preston North End, who they defeated with goals from Sodje and Constantine. The "Valiants" then vanquished Queens Park Rangers 3–2 in the Second Round. This left them facing Norwich City, the third Championship club of the season to travel to Burslem in the League Cup. Vale against upset the odds by winning the penalty shoot-out 3–2 following a goalless draw against a strong "Canary" side. Premier League Tottenham Hotspur awaited in the Fourth Round, who at White Hart Lane proved to be too much of a challenge for the Vale. Constantine put Vale into the lead, but a Tom Huddlestone goal took the game into extra-time, before both Huddlestone and Jermain Defoe scored to give "Spurs" a 3–1 win, thus saving Martin Jol's blushes. This represented the club's greatest achievement in the competition, as Vale had never reached the Fourth Round before.

In the League Trophy, Vale advanced past Scunthorpe United after winning on penalties at Glanford Park. They then had a home tie with local rivals Crewe Alexandra. The "Railwaymen" won the game 3–2 despite a brace from Constantine.

League table

Results
Port Vale's score comes first

Football League One

Results by matchday

Matches

FA Cup

League Cup

League Trophy

Player statistics

Appearances

Top scorers

Transfers

Transfers in

Transfers out

Loans in

Loans out

References
Specific

General
Soccerbase

Port Vale F.C. seasons
Port Vale